Tove Nielsen (28 March 1917 – 8 November 2002) was a Danish swimmer. She competed in the women's 100 metre backstroke at the 1936 Summer Olympics.

References

External links
 

1917 births
2002 deaths
Danish female backstroke swimmers
Olympic swimmers of Denmark
Swimmers at the 1936 Summer Olympics
Swimmers from Copenhagen